Cerje is an archaeological site dating from neolithic times. Its unique finds include the figurine known as Adam of Macedonia, one of the earliest prehistoric male figurines. Cerje is located near Skopje, North Macedonia.

References

Archaeological sites in North Macedonia
Buildings and structures in Skopje